Pedro Antônio Simeão (4 August 1953 – 19 June 2019), known as Pedrinho Gaúcho, was a Brazilian footballer who played as a forward. He competed in the men's tournament at the 1972 Summer Olympics.

References

External links
 

1953 births
2019 deaths
People from Lajeado
Brazilian footballers
Association football forwards
Brazil international footballers
Olympic footballers of Brazil
Footballers at the 1972 Summer Olympics
Sportspeople from Rio Grande do Sul